Quinacillin is a penicillin antibiotic which can reversibly deactivate beta-lactamase enzymes. Activity against Staphylococcus aureus is much more potent than against other Gram-positive organisms.

References 

Penicillins